Steven Jay Sinofsky (born 1965) is a former president of the Windows Division at Microsoft from July 2009 until his resignation on November 13, 2012.  He was responsible for the development and marketing of Windows, Internet Explorer, and online services such as Outlook.com and SkyDrive. Sinofsky is currently a board partner at Andreessen Horowitz, where he serves on boards of investments.

Early life and education
Steven Sinofsky was born in New York City in 1965 to parents Marsha and David Sinofsky. Growing up, Sinofsky attended Lake Brantley High School in Altamonte Springs, Florida. Subsequently, he attained his Bachelor of Arts from Cornell University, after graduating cum laude in 1987, in the fields of chemistry and computer science. Furthermore, he pursued his postgraduate education at the University of Massachusetts Amherst, where he acquired a Masters of Science in computer science in 1989.
He also spent 3 semesters learning Russian while he was in college.

Career
In July 1989, Sinofsky joined Microsoft as a software design engineer.

In 1994, when the Office Product Unit was formed, Sinofsky joined the team as the director of program management, and led the design of the shared technologies in Microsoft Office 95 and Microsoft Office 97. In 1994, during a recruiting visit to his alma mater, Cornell University, Sinofsky met a student, Sumeet Malhotra, who showed Sinofsky how he had helped in making Cornell “wired” by building a digital business-in-a-box system (called “Bear Access”) which comprehensively enabled most of the important higher education business operations at Cornell (including student account access, student grading, communication between different departments, faculty and students) during those early internet days. Sinofsky reported this back at Microsoft, which led to the creation of the “Internet Explorer”. Sinofsky spent about four years as a software design engineer and project lead in the Development Tools group, where he helped lead the development of the first versions of the Microsoft Foundation Classes C++ library for Microsoft Windows and Microsoft Visual C++.

He previously oversaw the development of the Microsoft Office system of programs, servers and services, responsible for the product development of Microsoft Office 2007 and its new ribbon UI. Prior to that he also oversaw the development of Microsoft Office 2003, Microsoft Office XP, and Microsoft Office 2000.

Sinofsky was actively involved in recruiting for Microsoft.  His particular task was to convince engineers not to move to Google. Sinofsky has blogged in detail about his efforts at Steven Sinofsky's Microsoft TechTalk, about what it's like to be a Microsoft employee, and what new hires in general most of the time never suspect or know about Microsoft, Bill Gates, Steve Ballmer, and Windows.

Sinofsky at the Windows division

Steven Sinofsky became the president of the Windows division in July 2009. His first heavily involved projects included Windows Live Wave 3 and Internet Explorer 8. Sinofsky and Jon DeVaan also headed the development of the next major version of Windows to come after Windows Vista, Windows 7.

Sinofsky's philosophy on Windows 7 was to not make any promises about the product or even discuss anything about the product until Microsoft was sure that it felt like a quality product. This was a radical departure from Microsoft's typical way of handling in-development versions of Windows, which was to publicly share all plans and details about it early in the development cycle. Sinofsky also refrained from labeling versions of Windows "major" or "minor", and instead just called them releases.

Under Sinofsky's leadership, the Windows Division successfully shipped the successor to Windows Vista, Windows 7, which had a rapidly growing user-base of over 450 million.  The success of Windows 7 contributed to record-breaking revenue earnings for Microsoft in 2010.

Sinofsky's leadership style influenced many other Microsoft divisions to follow his principles and practices on product development.

Sinofsky and Windows executive Jon DeVaan worked as editors for the Engineering Windows 7 blog.

Sinofsky worked on Windows 8 and regularly blogged about the feature set and the process of developing the new OS in his blog, Building Windows 8.

Sinofsky left Microsoft on December 31, 2012.  His departure was described by both parties as a mutual decision, but widely seen externally as the result of a power struggle or friction between himself – tipped as a future leader of the company – and CEO Steve Ballmer.  Technology website Ars Technica drew attention to the sense of staffing changes after a major project – the Windows 8 rollout,  but also noted the abrupt and exceptional manner of departure and a similar analysis of recent politics within Microsoft by ZDNet. Sinofsky was succeeded by Julie Larson-Green and Tami Reller. Larson-Green will run the engineering function of Windows, while Reller will oversee the business operations.   Microsoft disclosed in an SEC filing that Sinofsky would have a one-year non-compete contract in exchange for an estimated $14M of stock.

Book
One Strategy: Organization, Planning, and Decision Making, published by John Wiley & Sons in November 2009, was co-authored by Sinofsky and Marco Iansiti of Harvard Business School.

The book discusses Sinofsky's struggle with refocusing the Windows Division after the Vista debacle, and the planning and development of the next major version of Windows that would come after Vista. Sinofsky talks about the focus of making a desirable high-quality product, while making no promises to the public, and shipping and delivering that product on time.

References

Further reading

External links

 Steven Sinofsky's Microsoft TechTalk – Blog about working at Microsoft
 Steven Sinofsky on Twitter

1965 births
Living people
Microsoft employees
American business executives
Microsoft Windows people
Businesspeople from New York City
Cornell University alumni
University of Massachusetts Amherst alumni
Lake Brantley High School alumni